José Sánchez Moragón (born 6 October 1987 in Manacor, Balearic Islands) is a Spanish former footballer who played as a goalkeeper.

External links

1987 births
Living people
Sportspeople from Manacor
Spanish footballers
Footballers from Mallorca
Association football goalkeepers
Segunda División players
Segunda División B players
Tercera División players
CF Reus Deportiu players
Gimnàstic de Tarragona footballers
CE L'Hospitalet players
UE Costa Brava players